Sonaguera is a town, with a population of 14,920 (2020 calculation), and a municipality in the Department of Colón, Honduras, Central America, located approximately one hour southeast of La Ceiba. 

Sonaguera Municipality has a population of 46,568.

The area surrounding Sonaguera is principally agricultural, with the major crop being oranges.  Both Valencia and Pina oranges are grown in the region. The Association of Citricultores, Sonaguera, Colon (ACISON) represents the orange growers of the region.

References

External links
 ACISON blog

Municipalities of the Colón Department (Honduras)
Municipalities of Honduras